The 1967 Detroit Lions season was the 38th season in franchise history. On August 5, the Lions met the Denver Broncos in the first inter-league exhibition game. The Broncos beat the Lions 13–7 to become the first AFL team to beat an NFL team.

The Lions boasted both the NFL's Offensive and Defensive rookies of the year: running back Mel Farr and cornerback Lem Barney.

Offseason

NFL Draft

Regular season

Schedule

Game summaries

Week 1

Week 14

Standings

Roster

Playoffs

Awards and records

References 

 Detroit Lions on Pro Football Reference
 Detroit Lions on jt-sw.com
 Detroit Lions on The Football Database

Detroit Lions
Detroit Lions seasons
Detroit Lions